Castelfranco may refer to any of the following:

Italian towns
Castelfranco Emilia
Castelfranco in Miscano, in the Province of Benevento in Campania
Castelfranco di Sotto
Castelfranco di Sopra, in the Province of Arezzo in Tuscany.
Castelfranco Veneto

Art
Madonna of Castelfranco, a Renaissance masterpiece by Giorgione